The Genesis Drum and Bugle Corps is a World Class competitive junior drum and bugle corps, based in Austin, Texas. Genesis performs in Drum Corps International (DCI) competitions.

History
Sources:

Genesis was founded in September 2009 as a means for youth of the Rio Grande Valley to compete in drum corps, which they saw as "the next level of musical competition" beyond marching band. Success was far from certain, at a time when national and worldwide economics were causing the demise of dozens of long-established corps. After an examination by DCI to determine the group's organizational stability, in May 2010, DCI announced that Genesis was approved to compete in that summer's competitive season.

In its inaugural season, Genesis surprised many when it premiered at home in Texas. The corps then toured in Illinois, Michigan, Pennsylvania, and Ohio en route to the DCI Open Class World Championships in Michigan City, Indiana where the corps placed 9th in Open Class.

After its first year, Genesis' staff made the decision to have each season be a "rebirth of the corps," combining new genres of music and visual ideas with the traditional drum corps idiom. In 2011 and 2012, the corps moved up in Open Class, placing 6th both seasons before moving on to World Class prelims, where they finished 30th and 29th. In 2011, Genesis won DCI's "Most Improved Corps" award for Open Class.

In 2013, the corps rose to a 3rd place Open Class finish. Genesis then competed in the DCI World Class Championships in Indianapolis, Indiana, placing 23rd in semifinals, earning full DCI membership, and winning the World Class "Most Improved Corps" award. Additionally, Chris Magonigal was named DCI's Open Class Director of the Year.

In January 2014, Genesis announced that the corps would move its operations from Edinburg, Texas to Austin, Texas. Corps director Chris Magonigal stated: “With its centralized location, dedication to the arts, and its financial possibilities, Austin is the perfect city from which to operate our program.“

At the annual DCI meeting on January 27, 2017, Genesis was approved to compete as a World Class corps.

Sponsorship
Genesis Drum and Bugle Corps is a registered non-profit 501(c)(3) musical organization. Chris Magonigal is Executive Director, program coordinator, and corps director. Genesis also sponsors the Teatro Indoor Percussion ensemble, competing in the Winter Guard International Independent Open division.

Show summary (2010–2022)
Source:

References

External links
Official website

Drum Corps International World Class corps
Musical groups established in 2009
Organizations based in Texas
2009 establishments in Texas